Pope John Paul I died suddenly in September 1978, 33 days after his election. Following his death, several conspiracy theories have sprung.

Rationale
Discrepancies in the Vatican's account of the events surrounding Pope John Paul I's death—its inaccurate statements about who found the body; what he had been reading; when, where, and whether an autopsy could be carried out—produced a number of conspiracy theories, many associated with the Vatican Bank, which owned many shares in Banco Ambrosiano.

Some conspiracy theorists connect the death of John Paul in September 1978 with the image of the "bishop dressed in white" said to have been seen by Lucia Santos and her cousins Jacinta and Francisco Marto during the visitations of Our Lady of Fátima in 1917. In a letter to a colleague, John Paul had said he was deeply moved by having met Lucia and vowed to perform the Consecration of Russia in accordance with her vision.

Conspiracy theories

David Yallop
David Yallop's 1984 book In God's Name proposed the theory that the pope had been in "potential danger" because of corruption in the Vatican Bank (known officially as the Institute for Works of Religion or ), the Vatican's most powerful financial institution which owned many shares in Banco Ambrosiano. The Vatican Bank lost several hundred million dollars.

This corruption was real and is known to have involved the bank's head, Bishop Paul Marcinkus, along with Roberto Calvi of the Banco Ambrosiano. Marcinkus, at the time head of the Vatican Bank, was indicted in Italy in 1982 as an accessory in the $3.5billion collapse of Banco Ambrosiano. Calvi was a member of P2, an illegal Italian Masonic lodge. He was found dead in London in 1982, after disappearing just before the corruption became public. His death was initially ruled suicide and a second inquest – ordered by his family – then returned an open verdict. In October 2002 forensic experts appointed by Italian judges concluded that the banker had been murdered.

In his 2012 book The Power and The Glory: Inside the Dark Heart of John Paul II's Vatican, Yallop writes that Luciani had been given a list of 121 Masons and on September 28 (the day of his death) had advised Jean-Marie Villot, at that time Cardinal Secretary of State, with personnel transfers. Yallop specifically summarized his conspiracy theory in his 1984 book: Three archbishops—Marcinkus, Villot and Cody—conspired with three Mafia types—Calvi, Sindona and Gelli—in the murder of John Paul I. "It was clear that these six men—Marcinkus, Villot, Cody, Calvi, Sindona and Gelli—had a great deal to fear if the papacy of John Paul I should continue... all of them stood to gain in a variety of ways if John Paul I should suddenly die."

In his book A Thief in the Night, British historian and journalist John Cornwell examines and challenges Yallop's points of suspicion. Yallop's murder theory requires that the pope's body be found at 4:30 or 4:45 a.m., one hour earlier than official reports estimated. He bases this, inter alia, on an early story by Vatican Radio and the Italian news service ANSA that garbled the time and misrepresented the layout of the papal apartments. Yallop says he had testimony from Sister Vincenza Taffarel (the nun who found the pope's body) to this effect but refused to show Cornwell his transcripts.

Abbé Georges de Nantes
Theologian Abbé Georges de Nantes spent much of his life building a case for murder against the Vatican, collecting statements from people who knew the pope before and after his election. His writings go into detail about the banks and about John Paul I's supposed discovery of a number of Freemason priests in the Vatican, along with a number of his proposed reforms and devotion to Our Lady of Fátima.

Catholic Traditionalist Movement 
According to the Catholic Traditionalist Movement organization, their founder Fr. Gommar DePauw was to have gone to Rome to help John Paul I reestablish the Tridentine Mass:

Other prominent Traditionalist Catholic websites, not related to CTM, have suggested John Paul I may have been assassinated to prevent restoration of the Tridentine Mass.

Charles Murr
In his 2017 book The Godmother: Madre Pascalina, Fr. Charles Murr writes about the coincidence that Pope John Paul I had attempted to discipline Cardinal Sebastiano Baggio, who appointed many "liberal" bishops including, later, the defrocked ex-cardinal Theodore McCarrick, and that Cdl. Baggio was the last person to have seen Pope John Paul I alive.

Anthony Raimondi 
In his book When the Bullet Hits the Bone, which was published in 2019, Anthony Raimondi (who claims to be a nephew of Lucky Luciano) says he helped his cousin Archbishop Paul Marcinkus kill the pope by putting valium in his tea to knock him out, then poisoning him with cyanide. The reason given was that John Paul had allegedly threatened to expose "a massive stock fraud run by Vatican insiders". Raimondi says that plans were made to also assassinate John Paul II had the latter decided to expose the fraud. Raimondi says that "If they take [the pope's body] and do any type of testing, they will still find traces of the poison in his system."

In popular culture
Malachi Martin's 1986 book Vatican: A Novel is a novel based on recent papal history.

In December 1986, a play by Mark E. Smith of British post-punk band The Fall, Hey! Luciani: The Life and Codex of John Paul I, was staged for two weeks in London, starring performance artist Leigh Bowery. It drew on conspiracy theories about the pope's death. The Fall's single "Hey! Luciani" reached number 59 on the UK singles chart in December of that year.

The Last Confession is a play written in 2007 by Roger Crane. It is a thriller that tracks the dramatic tensions, crises of faith, and political manoeuvrings inside the Vatican surrounding the death of Pope John Paul I.

See also
List of murdered Popes
List of conspiracy theories#Anti-Catholic conspiracy theories
Vatican conspiracy theories
Jesuit conspiracy theories

References

Further reading 
Mark E Smith on JPI (New Musical Express, 13 December 1986
NY Times: Was the Pope murdered? (5 November, 1989)

 

C
John Paul I